Amomum dallachyi, commonly known as green ginger, is a plant in the ginger family that is native to Queensland, Australia.

References

dallachyi
Taxa named by Ferdinand von Mueller